Chaudhary Sadhu Ram (January 1909 – August 1975) was an Indian politician and five-time Member of Parliament.

Early life
Chaudhary Sadhu Ram was born in Chamar caste to Jawahar Mal at Domeli, Kapurthala, Punjab. He had studied at Khalsa High School, Domeli and invested in leather trade from Jalandhar. He became one of the first and richest Dalit from Doaba.

Movement
In late 1920s he joined Ad-Dharm movement founded by Mangu Ram Mugowalia. He became an active member of the movement but due to rifts among the leaders he led a separate faction, "All Indian Ad Dharm Mandal", headquartering at Lyallpur, Punjab.

He became a close aid of Dr. B.R. Ambedkar and joined Scheduled Castes Federation and became its president of state unit in 1942.

Politics

In 1946, he joined Indian National Congress and in 1954 became convenor of Depressed Classes League for PEPSU state.

In 1952, he fought his first election from Phagwara constituency of PEPSU Legislative Assembly and became Deputy Minister for Home Affairs.

In 1957 India general elections he won Jullundar Lok Sabha constituency and in 3rd, 4th and 5th Lok Sabha elections from Phillaur constituency of Punjab.

References

External links
Official biographical sketch in Parliament of India website

1909 births
1975 deaths
Indian National Congress politicians
Lok Sabha members from Punjab, India
India MPs 1957–1962
India MPs 1962–1967
India MPs 1967–1970
India MPs 1971–1977
People from Kapurthala district
People from Jalandhar district